Stephen Michael Wines (born June 3, 1951) is an American journalist. He is a national correspondent for The New York Times at present. Wines was previously the Times bureau chief in China, Johannesburg and Moscow.

Early life
Wines graduated from Pleasure Ridge Park High School in Louisville Kentucky. Later, Wines became a 1973 graduate of the University of Kentucky. He received his M.S. degree in journalism from the Columbia University Graduate School of Journalism in 1974.

Career
After receiving his M.S. degree, Wines became a general assignment reporter for The Lexington Herald. Wines covered municipal and state government, politics and education for The Louisville Times from 1974 to 1981. He wrote about regulatory affairs and the U.S. Department of Justice for National Journal magazine from 1981 to 1984.

From 1984 to 1988, Wines was a Washington-based correspondent for the Los Angeles Times.

He has been bureau chief at international postings for The New York Times since 2002.

Personal life
Wines is married to Sharon LaFraniere, who also writes for the Times. They have three children, Brett, Jack and Nikki.

References

1951 births
Living people
Writers from Louisville, Kentucky
University of Kentucky alumni
Columbia University Graduate School of Journalism alumni
American male journalists
Los Angeles Times people
The New York Times writers
Pleasure Ridge Park High School alumni
20th-century American journalists